Pyaar Ka Saagar is a 1961 Indian Hindi-language film starring Rajendra Kumar, Meena Kumari and Madan Puri in lead roles. The film is directed by Devendra Goel and its music is given by Ravi.

Plot 
After the passing of their parents Bishen Chand Gupta (Madan Puri) takes it upon himself to raise his younger brother, Kishen (Rajendra Kumar). He arranges for his education. While Kishen is holidaying in Mahabaleshwar, the bus they are traveling in, breaks down due to a storm, and the passengers are stranded. Kishen comes to the assistance of fellow-passenger, Radha (Meena Kumari), and both eventually and passionately fall in love with each other. As Radha's birthday is on the 20th of that month, Kishen purchases a statuette of Lord Kishan and Goddess Radha, symbolizing their love for each other, as a present for Radha. It is then her Bua tells him that Radha has been married. A shocked and devastated Kishen falls down the stairs, is injured, and loses his vision. He recuperates and goes back to Bombay to live with his brother, who is now married to a woman named Rani. Kishen does not know that Rani is none other than Radha, who is refusing to reveal her real name to Kishen. Watch what happens when Bishen asks her to convince Kishen to undergo eye surgery to restore his vision. Will Radha convince him, and if he regains his sight, how will the two adjust to living under the same roof?

Cast
 Rajendra Kumar as Kishanchand Gupta
 Meena Kumari as Radha / Rani Gupta
 Madan Puri as Bishanchand Gupta
 O. P. Ralhan as Ramesh
 Malika Askari as Sheela Sangram Singh
 Mohan Choti as Sheela's Cousin
 Leela Mishra as Radha's Aunty
 Jagdish Raj as Dr. Cooper (Eye Surgeon)

Crew
 Director – Devendra Goel
 Producer – Filmrays Productions
 Story – S. Nasiruddin Daroghaji
 Screenplay – Dhruva Chatterjee
 Dialogues – S. Nasiruddin Daroghaji, Vrajendra Gaur, Vishnu Mehrotra, Devendra Goel, Ehsan Rizvi
 Photography – Pandurang Naik
 Music – Ravi
 Lyrics – Prem Dhawan, Asad Bhopali
 Editing – R. V. Shrikhande
 Art Direction – D. Malvankar
 Playback Singers – Asha Bhosle, Mohammed Rafi, Shamshad Begum, Mukesh

Soundtrack
The film had eight songs in it. The music of the film was composed by Ravi. Prem Dhawan and Asad Bhopali wrote the lyrics.

References

External links
 

1961 films
Films directed by Devendra Goel
Films scored by Ravi
1960s Hindi-language films